James Henry Freake (27 January 1889 – 19 May 1937) was an Australian rules footballer who played with Fitzroy in the Victorian Football League (VFL). A full forward, Freake lacked the height and weight that most had for that position but had considerable pace and ball handling abilities.

Freake was a member of two Fitzroy premiership sides, the first in 1913 and the other in 1922, when he kicked four goals in the Grand Final. He won the club's best and fairest award in 1918.

His career tally of 442 goals is the fourth most achieved by a Fitzroy player and was a club record when he retired in 1924. He also kicked the most goals ever for Fitzroy in finals football with 45.  Other goalkicking feats include being the first Fitzroy player to kick 10 goals in a VFL match, topping their goalkicking seven times including a best of 66 goals in 1915 and twice being the leading goalkicker in a VFL season, in 1913 and 1915.

Freake died in Preston in 1937.

Notes

References
 Freake, J., "Golden Days of Partnership with Percy Parratt, The Sporting Globe, (Saturday, 7 September 1935), p.7.
 de Lacy, H.A. (1941), "Unforgettable Characters in Football: Dual Personality: Percy Parratt and Jimmy Freake", The Sporting Globe, (Saturday, 28 June 1941), p.6.

External links

1889 births
Australian rules footballers from Melbourne
Australian Rules footballers: place kick exponents
Fitzroy Football Club players
Fitzroy Football Club Premiership players
Mitchell Medal winners
Fitzroy Football Club coaches
1937 deaths
VFL Leading Goalkicker Medal winners
Two-time VFL/AFL Premiership players
People from Collingwood, Victoria